Mongeperipatus solorzanoi, or Solórzano's velvet worm, is a species of velvet worm in the Peripatidae family. Like other neotropical peripatid velvet worms, this species is viviparous, with mothers supplying nourishment to their embryos through a placenta.

Taxonomy
The holotype was discovered by herpetologist Alejandro Solórzano in Guayacán de Siquirres, Costa Rica, in 1996. Morera-Brenes and Monge-Nájera subsequently described it in 2010. The specific name solorzanoi is in honour of its discoverer.

In 2020, following the description of another similar species, this species was combined into a new genus, Mongeperipatus.

Description
The body is light brown or wine red with pale yellow oncopods (legs). Newborns are red. Males have 34 pairs of oncopods; females have 39 to 41, usually 41. This species is the largest velvet worm known, growing up to 22 cm (approximately 8.7 in) long.

References

Onychophorans of tropical America
Onychophoran species
Animals described in 2010